Prymnessus or Prymnessos, or Prymnesus or Prymnesos (Πρύμνησος), was a town of ancient Phrygia, inhabited during Roman and Byzantine times. It was the see of a Christian bishop. No longer the seat of a residential bishop, it remains a titular see of the Roman Catholic Church.

Its site is located near Sülün in Asiatic Turkey.

References

Populated places in Phrygia
Former populated places in Turkey
Roman towns and cities in Turkey
Populated places of the Byzantine Empire
Catholic titular sees in Asia
History of Afyonkarahisar Province
Afyonkarahisar District